Kutschera is a Germanized version of Czech surname Kučera. Notable people with the surname include:

Alexander Kutschera, German footballer
Chris Kutschera, French journalist
Elise Kutscherra de Nyss, German operatic soprano
Eugen Kutschera (1852–1918), Czech composer, conductor, teacher and music director
Franz Kutschera, German SS general
Hermann Kutschera, Austrian architect
Johann Nepomuk von Kutschera (1766-1832), Austrian General
Lore Kutschera (1917-2008), Austrian botanist, ecologist, phytosociologist, and educator
Maria von Trapp, born Maria Kutschera, stepmother and matriarch of the Trapp Family Singers.
Ulrich Kutschera, German scientist
Walter Kutschera, Austrian physicist

See also
Operation Kutschera, Polish resistance operation to assassinate Franz Kutschera

German-language surnames
Surnames of Czech origin
Surnames from nicknames